The Dodge WC-54, Ambulance, -ton, 4 x 4, (SNL supply catalog
designation G-502), was the main military ambulance variant of the prolific  Dodge WC series of light 4×4 trucks, developed during World War II. Built from 1942 until 1945, they served as the U.S. Army's main dedicated ambulance (besides the many multi-purpose jeeps serving as such), with many also serving in the Korean War, in the U.S. Army Medical Corps, some used as late as 1953; and others serving as late as the 1960s in the armies of some European countries.

Design and production
The ton WC-54 was designed as successor to the previous 1/2-ton, 4×4, G-505 models WC-9, WC-18, and WC-27 Dodge Ambulance trucks.
The WC-54s also had adjusted suspension to make their ride softer. 

The closed sheet-metal body was made by Wayne Body works. It had room for a driver and four to seven patients plus a medic. If the fold-away bunk stretchers were used, four patients could be transported lying down.
Because of its intended role, the WC-54 featured a large matrix cab heater fitted on the inner firewall, providing comfort for patients and crew. It was fitted with a foldaway step to its rear to allow easier access for stretcher bearers and injured personnel. Early models featured a stuck out fuel filler cap which was changed to a recessed one in the later model, a modification that was retrofitted to some early model trucks.

From 1942 to 1945, total production of the 3/4-ton Dodge WC-series was some 255,000. Of these, 29,502 were ambulances — 26,002 WC54 and 3,500 WC-64 KD models. The vehicles were supplied under US government contracts W398-QM-11420 (850 units), W398-QM-11422 (9,945 units), DAW398-QM-448 (16 units), W398-QM-13596 (410 units) and W374-ORD-2864 (11,636 units).

WC-64 Knock-Down

Virtually unchanged for three years, apart from minor technical tweaks, in 1945 it was replaced by a new knock-down body design, the WC64(KD). Based on essentially the same chassis as the WC54, the rear ambulance boxes were now split in two major sections: lower and upper, designed primarily to increase the number of vehicles that could be shipped at the same time. The lower part of the ambulance body was attached to the chassis at the factory, while the upper box consisted of flat panels, shipped in crates for installation in the field. Only produced in 1945, just 3,500 of these were made before the war ended. Other model changes made the WC64 more similar to the WC51: the factory-fitted lower ambulance-box outwardly resembles that of the WC51's rear bed boxes, though the WC64 is of course longer; and the flat instead of sloped hood, and spare wheel placement are now also like on a WC51.

The "knocked-down" condition was so much more space-efficient that two ambulances could now be stacked, and shipped in the same space that would previously hold only one conventional WC54 ambulance. Additionally, the reduced size also allowed air transportation of the vehicle.

Operators

Images

See also

Notes

References
 TM 9-2800 Standard Military Motor Vehicles, 1 sept. 1943, pages 356–357
 TM 9-2800 Military vehicles dated oct. 1947
 TM 9-808 3/4-ton Dodge truck dated Jan. 1944
 SNL G502
 SNL G657 Dodge master parts book
 Classic Military Vehicles (magazine). "Dodge WC54 Ambulance." Classic Military Vehicles Number 4, September 2001. Cudham, Kent, UK: Kelsey Publishing Limited.
 Classic Military Vehicles (magazine). "Dodge WC54 Ambulance." Classic Military Vehicles Number 11, April 2002.Cudham, Kent, UK: Kelsey Publishing Limited.

External links

A complete online collection Manuals for WWII Dodge WC-series 4×4 and 6×6 - by ExpODe.nl and ArmyVehicleMarking.com
 http://www.dodgewc54.com/
 http://www.dodgepowerwagonm880.com

 
World War II vehicles of the United States
Motor vehicles manufactured in the United States
Military light utility vehicles
Ambulances
Military ambulances
Military vehicles introduced from 1940 to 1944